HMS Prince Albert was designed and built as a shallow-draught coast-defence ship, and was the first British warship designed to carry her main armament in turrets. The ship was named after Prince Albert, the late husband of Queen Victoria. At her wish, Prince Albert remained on the "active" list until 1899, a total of 33 years, by which time she had long ceased to be of any military value.

Design 
The Board of Admiralty, in coming to decisions on the structure and dimensions of this ship, were faced with conflicting demands for stability, armour, gun-power, rig, speed and range. Captain Cowper Coles, a long-time advocate of turret-mounted armament, had produced a proposal in 1859 which, while not being accepted as produced, formed the basis for the design concept of Prince Albert.

The armament was disposed in four armoured turrets, each containing one heavy gun and each on the centre-line. The guns carried were the heaviest and most powerful available at the time, the  calibre muzzle-loading rifle. The absence of a poop and forecastle limited the activity of the ship in rough weather, but allowed end-on fire over the bow and stern from the end turrets.

Unlike the turrets in the contemporary American monitors, the turrets were rotated by hand; eighteen men could turn a turret through 360 degrees in about a minute.

Service history 
Prince Albert was commissioned at Portsmouth and was almost immediately withdrawn from service for trials and alterations, which lasted until 1867. She passed thereafter into the first division, Devonport Reserve. She formed part of the Particular Service Squadron formed in August 1878, after which she remained in reserve. She was re-commissioned for the Jubilee Review in 1887 and took part in naval manoeuvres in 1889. Prince Albert was relegated to Dockyard Reserve in 1898.

Notes

References 
 Oscar Parkes British Battleships 
 Conway All the World's Fighting Ships

External links

 

Battleships of the Royal Navy
Ships built in Cubitt Town
1864 ships
Victorian-era battleships of the United Kingdom